Gomati (Kumaoni: गोमती) is a tributary of the Saryu River. The river originates in the higher reaches of Bhatkot northwest to the town of Baijnath in Uttarakhand, India. It joins Saryu at Bageshwar, which then proceeds towards Pancheshwar where it joins the Kali River.

The Gomati Valley, also known as Katyur Valley after the Katyuri Kings of Baijnath, constitutes a major Agricultural zone of Kumaon. Major towns situated in this valley include Garur and Baijnath.

References

Rivers of Uttarakhand
Rivers of India